Algebraic analysis is an area of mathematics that deals with systems of linear partial differential equations by using sheaf theory and complex analysis to study properties and generalizations of functions such as hyperfunctions and microfunctions. Semantically, it is the application of algebraic operations on analytic quantities. As a research programme, it was started by the Japanese mathematician Mikio Sato in 1959. This can be seen as an algebraic geometrization of analysis. It derives its meaning from the fact that the differential operator is right-invertible in several function spaces.

It helps in the simplification of the proofs due to an algebraic description of the problem considered.

Microfunction 

Let M be a real-analytic manifold of dimension n, and let X be its complexification. The sheaf of microlocal functions on M is given as

where
  denotes the microlocalization functor,
  is the relative orientation sheaf.

A microfunction can be used to define a Sato's hyperfunction. By definition, the sheaf of Sato's hyperfunctions on M is the restriction of the sheaf of microfunctions to M, in parallel to the fact the sheaf of real-analytic functions on M is the restriction of the sheaf of holomorphic functions on X to M.

See also
 Hyperfunction
 D-module
 Microlocal analysis
 Generalized function
 Edge-of-the-wedge theorem
 FBI transform
 Localization of a ring
 Vanishing cycle
 Gauss–Manin connection
 Differential algebra
 Perverse sheaf
 Mikio Sato
 Masaki Kashiwara
 Lars Hörmander

Citations

Sources

Further reading
 Masaki Kashiwara and Algebraic Analysis
 Foundations of algebraic analysis book review

 
Complex analysis
Fourier analysis
Generalized functions
Partial differential equations
Sheaf theory